is an eroded stratovolcano in the area south-east of Mount Fuji, Japan.

Detailed map

Gallery

See Also
List of volcanoes in Japan
List of mountains in Japan

References

The page incorporated material from Japanese Wikipedia page 愛鷹山, accessed 23 April 2019

External links
 
 Ashitaka Yama - Geological Survey of Japan

Extinct volcanoes
Izu–Bonin–Mariana Arc
Pleistocene lava domes
Mountains of Shizuoka Prefecture
Pleistocene stratovolcanoes
Stratovolcanoes of Japan
Subduction volcanoes
Volcanoes of Honshū